CanDeal is a Canadian online exchange for Canadian dollar debt securities.  It provides institutional investors access to liquidity for Canadian Government Bonds and money market instruments. CanDeal has offices in Toronto and Montreal and is owned by Canada's Six Major Banks and TMX Group (equally as of 2018 compared to a previous ownership structure in which TMX owned 47%).

CanDeal became a member of the Investment Dealers Association of Canada, and was granted alternative trading system status by the Ontario Securities Commission on July 2, 2002.

History
June 27, 2001 – CanDeal is created by founding shareholders BMO Nesbitt Burns, Basis100 inc.,  CIBC World Markets Inc., MoneyLine Network Inc., National Bank Financial Inc.,  RBC Dominion Securities Inc., Scotia Capital Inc. and TD Securities Inc.
July 8, 2002 – TMX Group acquires a 40% stake in CanDeal.
September 10, 2002 – CanDeal executes its first trade.
January 1, 2003 - CanDeal's founder Jayson Horner leaves TD Securities to become full-time President and CEO of CanDeal.
February 11, 2003 – CanDeal purchases Basis100's equity interest along with the rights to BasisXchange in Canada.
September 9, 2003 – CanDeal adds Provincial Bond issues to its marketplace.
August 18, 2004 – Aggregate volume traded on CanDeal surpasses $100 billion.
October 19, 2004 – CanDeal announces its single day trading volume surpasses C$1 billion.
December 1, 2004 – CanDeal trades $10 billion in a single month.
November 1, 2005 – CanDeal launches a new division, Revolution Trading, an electronic inter-dealer trading network.
March 24, 2006 - CanDeal acquires Moneyline's shares.
October 11, 2006 – CanDeal surpasses One-half Trillion in aggregate volume traded.
August 8, 2007 – CanDeal announces that it has surpassed One Trillion Dollars in aggregate volume traded since inception.
June 1, 2009 – CanDeal introduces butterfly trading to its marketplace.
February 24, 2010 – CanDeal launches mobile fixed income pricing application for institutional professionals.
July 7, 2010 – CanDeal Traded Volume Surpass $3 Trillion
April 13, 2011 – CanDeal Volumes Surpass $4 Trillion; New Record Month and Quarter Set.
January 13, 2013 – CanDeal launches the first multi-dealer-to-client trading platform for Canadian dollar interest rate swaps.
June 18, 2014 – CanDeal surpasses $10 Trillion in aggregate fixed income & derivatives volume traded.
October 30, 2018 – CanDeal's ownership restructured such that each of the six largest Canadian banks and the TMX have an equal stake in CanDeal.
February 12, 2019 – CanDeal and the ownership group create Canada's first comprehensive fixed-income and derivatives market data hub called CanDeal Data & Analytics (DNA).
December 16, 2019 – CanDeal surpasses $25 Trillion in aggregate volume traded.
March 9, 2021 – CanDeal Data & Analytics (DNA) acquires CIBC's fixed income data business.
June 27, 2022 – Canadian banks officially partner with CanDeal to deliver industry-wide KYC "know your customer" solution.

Products
CanDeal has three divisions: CanDeal Markets, CanDeal Solutions and CanDeal Data & Analytics (DNA).

CanDeal Markets provides institutional investors with online access to liquidity for Canadian debt securities, as well as access to global marketplaces in the United States and Europe operated by Tradeweb. CanDeal utilizes the "Request for Quote" (RFQ) trading protocol to trade the most active government securities and a commingled "inventory" based trading protocol for less active money market instruments. The electronic trading coverage includes:

 Rates/Bond Trading: Canadian/Federal government bonds in the secondary market.
 Money Markets Trading: Canadian short-term debt investments.
 Over-the-counter Derivatives Trading: CAD and USD interest rate swaps (IRS) in compliance with cross-border regulations.
 Credit/Bond Trading: Canadian corporate bonds with benchmarking against the previous day's 4pm price and spread, as well as Canadian provincial, municipal and mortgage bonds.

Offerings include:

 CanAuction: enabling fixed income auctions between issuers and dealers.
 CANIssue: managing the workflow for dealers participating in the Canadian Corporate New Issue Bond Market. 
 Electronic Buyback Platform: developing and deploying a 'reverse auction' platform to provide dealers and clients with an opportunity to sell provincial and corporate securities to the Bank of Canada through an auction process.
 KYC Compliance: improving "know your customer" and anti-money laundering practices for clients and dealers.

CanDeal Data & Analytics (DNA) provides pricing in the Canadian OTC fixed income and derivatives markets. Trading products include: 
 a spreadsheet add-in, 
 pricing feeds, 
 daily pricing files, 
 trading files, 
 compliance files (buy-side only) and historical data.

References

Financial services companies of Canada